Reyhan Angelova (Yambol, 23 July 1986 - 25 August 2005) was a Bulgarian pop singer. An ethnic Turk who sang in Turkish, she began her career as a singer in Orchestra Kristal and was released two albums, followed by a solo album in 2003. Reyhan died in a car accident in 2005

Discography
Biz ikimiz esmeris (2001)
Reĭkhan i ork. Kristal (2002) 
Inan sevgilim (2003) debut solo album
V pamet na Reĭkhan (2005) posthumous compilation

References

1986 births
2005 deaths
Bulgarian child singers
Bulgarian folk-pop singers
Bulgarian people of Turkish descent
20th-century Bulgarian women singers
Road incident deaths in Bulgaria